Scouts et Guides de France (Scouts and Guides of France, SGdF) is the largest Scouting and Guiding association in France. It was formed on 1 September 2004 from the merger of two Roman Catholic Scouting organizations: the Guides de France (founded in 1923) and the Scouts de France (SdF, founded 25 July 1920). Through Scoutisme Français, SGdF is a member of both WOSM and WAGGGS.

SGdF claims 61,181 youth members and 27,399 volunteers in 863 local groups. It is active in the rebirth of Scouting in Ukraine and Belarus and strengthening Scouting in French Polynesia. The National Centre of the association is at Chateau de Jambville which is 50 km southwest of Paris.

History

SdF Chief Scouts
General Louis de Maud'huy (1920-16 July 1921)
General Arthur Guyot de Salins 1922-11 August 1936)
General Joseph Lafont 1936-1944 SdF Chief Scout/Scoutisme Français Chief Scout 1948 Wilson

Honorary President
Maréchal Hubert Lyautey 1925 - 1934

General Commissioners
Père Jacques Sevin S.J. 1920 - 1924 
 undocumented between 1924 and 1932
René Lhopital 1932-1936
Henri Gasnier 1936 - 1939
Henry Dhavernas 1939 (provisional)
Eugène Dary 1940-1944   Pierre Delsuc General Commissioner of zone Nord 1941- 1944
Pierre Delsuc 1944 - 1946
Georges Gaultier 1946-1953
Michel Rigal 1953-1970
Emile-Xavier Visseaux 1970-1975
Dominique Bénard 1975 - 1983
Robert Wettstein 1983 - 1989
Bertrand Chanzy 1989-1995
Philippe Da Costa 1995-2002
Claude Moraël 2002-2004

Guides de France

Chief Guide
Albertine Duhamel 1924 - 1933
Marie Thérèse de Kerraoul 1933 - 1954

General Commissioners
Andrée Dalberto 1948 - 1953
Antoinette Reille 1953
Marie-Thérèse Cheroutre 1953-1979
Monique Mitrani 1979-?
Caline Forest
Claude Mangin ?-1997
Hélène de la Messelière 1997-2003

Vice President delegate
Françoise Parmentier 2003-2004

Scouts et Guides de France

General Delegates
Claude Moraël 2004-2008
Philipe Bancon 2008-2013
Catherine Larrieu 2013-2016
Christian Larcher 2016-2016
Olivier Mathieu 2016-2021
Anne-Claire Bellay-Huet 2021-present

Presidents
Hélène Renard 2004
Guillaume Légaut 2004-2011
Gilles Vermot-Desroches 2011-2017
Marie-Astrid Mullet-Abrassart 2017-present

Programme

Programme Sections:
 Farfadets (Beavers): ages 6 to 8
 Louveteaux/Jeannettes (Cubs): ages 8 to 12
 Scouts/Guides: ages 11 to 15
 Pionniers/Caravelles (Venturer): ages 14 to 17
 Compagnons (Rovers): ages 17 to 21
 Mousses (Sea Scouts): ages 14 to 17
 Vent du Large: handicapped division

The Scout motto is Toujours Prêt, Always Prepared in French.

Scout Oath (SdF):
 Sur mon honneur, et avec la grâce de Dieu, je m'engage a servir de mon mieux, Dieu, l'Église et la patrie, à aider mon prochain en toutes circonstances et à observer la loi scoute.

 On my honor and with the grace of God, I promise to do my best to serve God, the Church and my country, to help my neighbour in any circumstance and to observe the Scout Law.

Scout Law (SdF):

1964 Version:
 Le scout met son honneur à mériter confiance.The Scout must strive to be trustworthy.
 Le scout est loyal à son pays, ses parents, ses chefs et ses subordonnés.The Scout is loyal to his country, his parents, his leaders and his subordinates.
 Le scout est fait pour servir et sauver son prochain.The Scout must serve and save his neighbour.
 Le scout est l'ami de tous et l'ami de tout autre Scout.The Scout is a friend of everybody and all other Scouts.
 Le scout est courtois et chevaleresque.The Scout is polite and chivalrous.
 Le scout voit dans la nature l'oeuvre de Dieu, il aime les plantes et les animaux.The Scout sees God's work in nature. He loves plants and animals.
 Le scout obéit sans réplique et ne fait rien à moitié.The Scout obeys without replying and does nothing by halves. Le scout est maître de soi, il sourit et chante dans les difficultés.The Scout is his own master, smiling and singing during hardships. Le scout est économe et prend soin du bien d'autrui.The Scout is sparing and takes care of what is others. Le scout est pur dans ses pensées, ses paroles et ses actes.The Scout must be pure in his thoughts, words and actions.Current version: Le scout tient parole. En patrouille, je m’affirme et je fais des choix.The Scout keeps his word. In my patrol, I stand my ground and I make decisions.
 Le scout développe ses talents. En patrouille, j’invente et j’explore.The Scout develops his talents. In my patrol, I invent and I explore.
 Le scout a l’esprit d’équipe. En patrouille, j’accueille et je rends service.The Scout has team spirit. In my patrol, I accept everybody and I serve.
 Le scout prend soin de son corps. En patrouille, je me dépasse.The Scout takes care for his body. In my patrol, I surpass myself.
 Dieu propose au scout, un chemin. En patrouille, je découvre en Jésus un ami.God proposes a way to the Scout. In my patrol, I discover a friend in Jesus.
 Le scout respecte l’autre. Fille ou garçon, j’exprime mes sentiments.The Scout respects other people. Girl or boy, I express my feelings.

Emblems
The red Jerusalem Cross with the fleur-de-lis was the symbol of the Scouts de France. It was designed by Father Jacques Sévin SJ, co-founder of the Fédération des Scouts de France. The Guides de France used the same Jerusalem Cross with a superimposed trefoil. The emblem of the merged organization combines elements of both predecessors. The round orange background recalls the rope circle, which symbolizes the strength of the Movement.

Literature
 Le scoutisme, from father Jacques Sévin
 Pour penser scoutement, from father Jacques Sévin
 Philippe Laneyrie, Les scouts de France, Editions du Cerf,

See also
Scouting in France

References

External links
Official website 
English content of sgdf.fr

World Association of Girl Guides and Girl Scouts member organizations
World Organization of the Scout Movement member organizations
Scouting and Guiding in France
Organizations established in 2004